The 1942–43 Connecticut Huskies men's basketball team represented University of Connecticut in the 1942–43 collegiate men's basketball season. The Huskies completed the season with an 8–7 overall record. The Huskies were members of the New England Conference, where they ended the season with a 5–3 record. The Huskies played their home games at Hawley Armory in Storrs, Connecticut, and were led by seventh-year head coach Don White.

Schedule 

|-
!colspan=12 style=""| Regular Season

Schedule Source:

References 

UConn Huskies men's basketball seasons
Connecticut
1942 in sports in Connecticut
1943 in sports in Connecticut